Kæm va du? is the third studio album released by Norwegian musician Moddi. The album was released on 11 October 2013 through Propeller Recordings in Norway. The album peaked at number five on the Norwegian Albums Charts. The album includes the single "Grønt Lauv I Snyen" and "En Sang Om Fly".

Singles
"Grønt Lauv I Snyen" was released as the lead single from the album on 16 July 2013. "En Sang Om Fly" was released as the second single from the album on 20 September 2013.

Track listing

Chart performance

Weekly charts

Release history

References

2013 albums
Moddi albums